Chicwillasaw Creek is a stream in the U.S. state of Mississippi. It is a tributary to Souenlovie Creek.

Chicwillasaw is a name derived from the Choctaw language meaning "deserted house". A variant name is "Chukillissa Creek".

References

Rivers of Mississippi
Rivers of Clarke County, Mississippi
Rivers of Jasper County, Mississippi
Mississippi placenames of Native American origin